A composite or a composite index is a combination of equities or indexes intended to measure the overall market performance over time.

A composite index may also be used in the natural or social sciences to summarize complex or multidimensional data or redundant measures. An example of a composite index in the social sciences is used in the European Lifelong Learning Indicators (ELLI) project.

References

External links 
Composite on Investopedia

Financial markets